Thaddeus O'Sullivan (born 2 May 1947) is an Irish director, cinematographer, and screenwriter.

Early career
In the early eighties O'Sullivan was among a group of filmmakers who co-founded 'Spectre' a collective that included John Ellis (media academic), Simon Hartog, Anna Ambrose,  Vera Neubauer, Phil Mulloy, Keith Griffiths and Michael Whyte.

Filmography

Awards
1990 won the Silver Rosa Camuna at the Bergamo Film Meeting for December Bride (1991)
1990 won the Special Prize of the Jury at the European Film Awards for December Bride (1991)
1990 won the FIPRESCI Prize at the Montréal World Film Festival Out-of-Competition for December Bride (1991)
1996 won the Audience Award at the Cherbourg-Octeville Festival of Irish & British Film for Nothing Personal (1995)

References

Further reading
 Grunert, Andrea. "Défier les traditions par le sexe : December Bride de Thaddeus O'Sullivan", in: Penny Starfield (ed.) Femmes et pouvoir, Corlet [France] 2008, p. 180-185, 
Jones, Ellen Carol. "'Heart-Mysteries There': The Films of Thaddeus O'Sullivan," in Morris Beja, Ellen Carol Jones, Cecilia Beecher Martins, José Duarte, Suzana Ramos, eds., "Cinematic Narratives: Transatlantic Perspectives," Humus, 2017, pp. 278–306.
 McLoone, Martin, December Bride: A Landscape Peopled Differently, in: James MacKillop (ed.)Contemporary Irish Cinema, Syracuse University Press, 1999, p. 40-53, 
 O'Sullivan, Thaddeus, "So Truthful in the Particular," interview by Ellen Carol Jones and Morris Beja, in Morris Beja, Ellen Carol Jones, Cecilia Beecher Martins, José Duarte, Suzana Ramos, eds., "Cinematic Narratives: Transatlantic Perspectives," Humus, 2017, pp. 307–326.
 Pettitt, Lance, December Bride Cork University Press ("Ireland into Film") 2001,

External links

1947 births
Living people
Irish film directors
Irish cinematographers
Irish screenwriters
Irish male screenwriters
European Film Awards winners (people)
Film people from Dublin (city)